Henry Plummer Doe (October 4, 1841 – May 4, 1904) was an American jeweler and politician who served as the twenty-seventh Mayor of Lawrence, Massachusetts.

Bibliography

Massachusetts of Today: A Memorial of the State, Historical and Biographical, Issued for the World's Columbian Exposition at Chicago, page 461, (1892)

Footnotes

  

1841 births
Massachusetts Democrats
Massachusetts city council members
Mayors of Lawrence, Massachusetts
Members of the Universalist Church of America
1904 deaths
19th-century American politicians